Alton is a given name. Notable people with the name include:

Alton Adams (1889–1987), first African-American bandmaster in the U.S. Navy
Alton Alexis (born 1957), former National Football League wide receiver
Alton Brown (born 1962), American cinematographer, author, actor, and television personality
Alton Brown (1925–2016), former Major League Baseball relief pitcher
Alton Byrd (born 1957), American basketball player
Alton Coleman (1955–2002), African-American spree killer
Alton Ellis (1938–2008), Jamaican musician
Alton W. Knappenberger (1923–2008), U.S. Army soldier awarded the Medal of Honor in World War II
Alton Lennon (1906–1986), U.S. Senator and Congressman from North Carolina
Alton Lister (born 1958), American former National Basketball Association player
Alton Mason (born 1997), American fashion model
Alton Glenn Miller (1904–1944), American big-band trombonist, arranger, composer and bandleader
Alton Morgan (1932–2022), American businessman and politician
Alton Ochsner (1896–1981), American surgeon and medical researcher
Alton B. Parker (1852–1926), American lawyer, judge, and Democratic nominee for U.S. president in 1904
Alton C. Parker (1907–1989), Canadian detective
Alton Robinson (born 1998), American football player
Alton D. Slay (1924–2015), U.S. Air Force four-star general 
Alton Thelwell (born 1980), English footballer
Alton Tobey (1914–2005), American artist and teacher of art
Alton Waldon (born 1936), American politician

See also
Elton (name), given name and surname

English-language masculine given names